John B. Carr (September 18, 1900–June 6, 1969) was an American politician who was active in the Massachusetts Democratic Party. He rose from obscurity to win the party's nomination for Lieutenant Governor of Massachusetts in 1944. He also served as chairman of the Somerville, Massachusetts board of assessors.

Early life
Carr was born and raised in Somerville. After graduating from Somerville High School he traveled the country as a commercial photographer. In 1932 he met his wife in Rochester, New York. The couple settled in Somerville, where Carr worked for a local manufacturing firm. He eventually rose to the position of sale's manager. The Carrs had two sons.

Political career
Carr became involved in the Democratic party in the early 1920s. In 1929 he helped John J. Murphy get elected Mayor of Somerville. In 1940 he managed Francis E. Kelly's gubernatorial campaign in Somerville. He remained involved in Kelly's political organization and also served as chairman of Somerville's Ward 2 Democratic committee and as vice chairman of the Somerville Democratic committee.

On January 1, 1943 he was appointed to the Somerville board of assessors by mayor G. Edward Bradley. He remained on the board until 1962, when he resigned due to illness. He served as the board's chairman for six years.

In 1944, Carr ran for Lieutenant Governor of Massachusetts. He won the four-way contest for the Democratic nomination with 33% of the vote. Although he was a relative unknown in statewide politics, Carr did have a similar name to his party's 1942 lieutenant gubernatorial nominee, John C. Carr. John C. Carr chose to break with the party and endorse Republican Robert Bradford over John B. Carr in the general election. Carr lost the general election to Bradford 52% to 47%, though his running-mate Maurice Tobin won in his contest, causing the Governor and Lieutenant Governor seats to be held by members of different parties from 1945–47.

Carr ran for Lieutenant Governor a second time in 1946, but only received 7% of the vote in the Democratic primary.

In 1950, Carr was the Democratic nominee for the United States House of Representatives seat in Massachusetts's 8th congressional district. He lost to Republican incumbent Angier Goodwin 54% to 46%. Carr ran again in 1952, but was ruled off the ballot by the State Ballot Law Commission due to insufficient signatures. Carr alleged that this removal from the ballot occurred due to nepotism; he would have run in the primary against John C. Carr, Jr., the son of John C. Carr who served as the chairman of the state Democratic Committee.  After the removal of J. B. Carr from the primary contest, J. C. Carr, Jr. was the only Democratic candidate for the 8th congressional seat; he later lost to Angier Goodwin in the general election.

Carr died on June 6, 1969 after a long illness. He was 68 years old.

References

1900 births
1969 deaths
20th-century American politicians
Massachusetts Democrats
Politicians from Somerville, Massachusetts